Benhamina obliquata is a species of air-breathing sea snail, a false limpet, a marine pulmonate gastropod mollusc in the family Siphonariidae. 

This species is very large compared with the other species in the family.

This is the only species in this genus; in other words, Benhamina is a monotypic genus. It is endemic to New Zealand.

Generic name Benhamina is in tribute to British oligo- and polychaetologist, William Blaxland Benham.

References

 WoRMS

Further reading 
 Borland C. 1950. Ecological Study of Benhamina obliquata (Sowerby), A Basommatophorous Pulmonate in Otago Harbour. Transactions and Proceedings of the Royal Society of New Zealand, Volume 78, 385-393.
 Sowerby, G. B., I. (1825). A catalogue of the shells contained in the collection of the late Earl of Tankerville : arranged according to the Lamarckian conchological system: together with an appendix, containing descriptions of many new species London, vii + 92 + xxxiv pp

Siphonariidae
Gastropods described in 1825
Taxa named by George Brettingham Sowerby I
Taxa named by Harold John Finlay